Deo or DEO may refer to:

People 
 Derek Oldbury (1924–1994), known as DEO, a British draughts champion

Surname
 Abhinay Deo, Indian film director and screenwriter
 Ajinkya Deo (born 1964), Indian film actor
 Ananga Udaya Singh Deo (born 1945), Indian politician
 Anant Pratap Deo, Indian politician
 Arka Keshari Deo, Indian politician
 Arkesh Singh Deo (born 1986), Indian politician
 Ashish Deo, Indian script writer and film director
 Baljit Singh Deo, Indian music video and movie director
 Bikram Keshari Deo (1952–2009)), Indian politician
 Bira Kesari Deo (1927–2012)), Indian politician
 Gobind Singh Deo (born 1973), Malaysian politician and lawyer
 Jagannatha Gajapati Narayana Deo II (c.1733–1771)), king of Paralakhemundi state, southern Odisha, India
 Jagdeep Singh Deo (born 1971), Malaysian politician
 Jitamitra Prasad Singh Deo (born 1946), Indian historian and archaeologist
 Jitesh Singh Deo (born 1995), Indian actor, civil engineer and model
 Kalikesh Narayan Singh Deo (born 1974), Indian politician and army officer
 Kamakhya Prasad Singh Deo (born 1941), Indian politician
 Kanak Vardhan Singh Deo (born 1956), Indian politician
 Kishore Chandra Deo (born 1947), Indian politician
 Laxmi Narayan Bhanja Deo (1912–1986), Indian politician
 M. G. Deo, (born 1932), Indian oncologist, pathologist and educationist
 Narsingh Deo, Indian and American professor of computer science
 Neelam Deo, Indian Foreign Service Officer
 Pratap Keshari Deo (1919–2001), Indian politician and the last ruler of Kalahandi State
 Pravir Chandra Bhanj Deo (1929–1966), first Odia ruler and 20th Maharaja of Bastar state, India
 Rajendra Narayan Singh Deo (1912–1975), Indian politician and the last ruler of Patna
 Ramesh Deo (1929–2022), Indian film and television actor
 Roshika Deo (born 1981), Fijian feminist and activist
 Sangeeta Kumari Singh Deo (born 1961), Indian politician
 Sankar Narayan Singh Deo (born 1922), Indian politician
 Seema Deo, Indian film actress
 Shankarrao Deo, Indian politician
 Shirish Baban Deo, Indian Air Marshal
 Sriram Chandra Bhanj Deo (1870–1912), Maharaja of Mayurbhanj State, India
 Suresh Deo (born 1946), Indian cricket umpire
 T. S. Singh Deo (born 1952), Indian politician
 Vir Singh Deo (fl.1605–1626), ruler of the kingdom of Orchha and a vassal of the Mughal Empire
 Vishnu Deo (1900–1968), Indo-Fijian political leader

Forename
 Agni Deo Singh, Indo-Fijian teacher and trade unionist
 Akanksha Deo Sharma (born 1992), Indian industrial designer, textile innovator and visual artist
 Arjun Deo Charan (born 1954), Indian poet, critic, playwright, theatre director and translator
 Deo (futsal player) or André Henrique Justino (born 1982), Brazilian futsal player
 Deo Brando, Congolese musician and entertainer
 Deo Filikunjombe (1972–2015), Tanzanian politician
 Deo Gracia Ngokaba (born 1997), Congolese judoka
 Déo Kanda (born 1989), Congolese footballer
 Deo A. Koenigs (born 1935), American politician
 Deo Kumar Singh (1950–2018), leader of the Indian Maoist movement
 Deo Nang Toï (1914–2008), daughter and successor of Deo Van Long, president of the Fédération Taï, French Indochina
 Deo Narain, Fijian politician
 Deo Narayan Yadav (c.1921–2003), Indian politician
 Deo Nath Yadav, Indian politician
 Deo Nukhu, Indian politician
 Deo Prakash Rai (1926–1981), Indian politician
 Déo Rian (born 1944), Brazilian musician
 Deo Rwabiita (1943–2017), Ugandan politician and diplomat
 Deo Sanga (born 1956), Tanzanian politician
 Đèo Văn Long (1887–1975), leader of the Autonomous Tai Federation of North-western Tonkin, French Indochina
 Đèo Văn Trị (1849–1908), White Tai leader at Muang Lay in the Federation of the Twelve Tai states, French Indochina
 Harsh Deo Malaviya (1917–1989), Indian journalist and economist with socialist ideas
 Kapil Deo Kamat (1951–2020), Indian politician
 Ram Deo Bhandary (1940–2018), Indian politician
 Ram Deo Ram (born 1937), Indian politician
 Satya Deo Singh (1945–2020), Indian politician
 Surya Deo Sharma, Hindu leader and Trustee of Shri Peetambra Peeth Datia, India
 Vikram Deo Verma (1869–1951), 25th king of the Suryavansh dynasty that ruled over Kalinga and Jeypore Samasthanam, India
 Vyas Deo Sharma, Fijian politician

Places

India
 Deo, Bihar, a city in Bihar state, north-eastern India
 Deo Barunark, a village in Bihar
 Deo Damla, a mountain of the Garhwal Himalaya in Uttarakhand
 Deo Fort, a fort in Deo, Bihar
 Deo Raj, a zamindari estate in Deo, Bihar
 Deo River, Jharkhand
 Deo Surya Mandir, a Hindu temple in Bihar
 Deo Tibba, a mountain in Kullu District, Himachal Pradesh
 Lohar Deo, a mountain of the Garhwal Himalaya in Uttarakhand

Elsewhere
 Coram Deo Academy, a Christian school in Texas, USA
 Deo, Central African Republic
 Đèo Gia, a commune and village in north-eastern Vietnam
 Deo Sial, a town in Pakistan
 Deutsche Evangelische Oberschule, a German school in Cairo, Egypt
 Dragi Deo, a village in Serbia
 Faro-et-Déo, a department of Adamawa Province, Cameroon
 Kala Deo, a village in Pakistan

Other uses 
 Deo, a synonym of the Greek goddess Demeter
 Department of Extranormal Operations, a fictional organization from DC Comics
 Ex Deo, a Canadian death metal band

See also 
 
 Deò-ghrèine
 Dio (disambiguation)
 

Indian given names
Indian surnames